Shah Hussain Shah Sheerazi is a Pakistani politician who had been a Member of the Provincial Assembly of Sindh, from May 2013 to May 2018.

Early life 
He was born on 20 July 1977 in Thatta.

Political career

He was elected to the Provincial Assembly of Sindh as a candidate of Pakistan Muslim League (N) from Constituency PS-86 THATTA-III in 2013 Pakistani general election.

He was re-elected to Provincial Assembly of Sindh as a candidate of Pakistan Peoples Party (PPP) from Constituency PS-75 (Sujawal-I) in 2018 Pakistani general election.

References

Living people
Sindh MPAs 2013–2018
1977 births
Pakistan People's Party MPAs (Sindh)
Sindh MPAs 2018–2023